High Lane railway station was a railway station serving the village of High Lane in Greater Manchester, England. It was opened in 1869 by the Macclesfield, Bollington and Marple Railway (MB&M) - a joint line constructed and operated by the Manchester, Sheffield and Lincolnshire Railway (MS&L) and North Staffordshire Railways (NSR).

Like the other stations on the MB&M, the station buildings and signalling were provided by the NSR and train services by the MS&L.

The station closed in January 1970, along with the entirety of the MB&M. The track was lifted and the trackbed now forms part of the Middlewood Way, a recreational path between Macclesfield and Marple.

References
Notes

Sources

Railway stations in Great Britain opened in 1869
Railway stations in Great Britain closed in 1970
Disused railway stations in Greater Manchester
Former Macclesfield Committee stations
1869 establishments in England
Beeching closures in England